The discography of Obituary, an American death metal band, consists of ten studio albums, one live album, two compilation albums, two extended plays, two DVDs and seven music videos.

Obituary was formed in Tampa, Florida in 1984 under the name Executioner (later called Xecutioner). The band spent four years playing live locally and went through several line-up changes, before changing their name to Obituary in 1988. After signing to Roadrunner Records, Obituary's debut album, Slowly We Rot, was released in 1989, followed one year later by Cause of Death (1990); both albums did not chart.

Obituary gained their first mainstream exposure with their third studio album, The End Complete (1992), which was accompanied by their first music video "The End Complete", and was the band's first album to chart in the United States, United Kingdom and some parts of Europe, leading the album to sell more than a hundred thousand copies. Obituary continued their success with their next two studio albums—World Demise (1994) and Back from the Dead (1997)—before calling it quits in 1997.

Obituary reunited in 2003, and released their sixth studio album Frozen in Time two years later. Around 2006, Obituary ended their 18-year relationship with Roadrunner, and signed to the independent record label Candlelight Records, and their debut for the label Xecutioner's Return was released in 2007, followed two years later by Darkest Day (2009). Obituary did not release their next studio album, Inked in Blood, until 2014; it was their first release on Gibtown Music/Relapse Records, and their first to enter the Billboard 200 charts, where it peaked at number 75. That album was followed three years later by Obituary (2017), which was also successful, peaking at higher chart positions in Europe.

Studio albums

Live albums

Extended plays

Compilation albums

Video albums

Music videos

References

Heavy metal group discographies
Discographies of American artists